The Independent Baghdad Tournament (Arabic:  دورة بغداد الخاصة) was a tournament organised by the Iraq Football Association in 1973, independently from its main regional league competitions, to allow the region's top-flight teams to continue playing matches after the premature end to the 1972–73 Iraq Central FA First Division. The teams were not able to field players that had been called up for the Iraq national team or the Iraq military team, as those players were preparing for the World Cup qualifiers and the Military World Championship respectively.

The tournament began on 5 March, with the regular season ending on 24 May and the final being played on 14 June, where Al-Sikak Al-Hadeed beat Aliyat Al-Shorta 3–1 to claim the title.

Regular season

League table

Known results

Final

References

External links
Iraqi Football Website

1972–73 in Iraqi football